Side Effect is the second album by R&B group Side Effect. Released in 1975, this was their first album for Fantasy Records.

Track listing
Baby Love (Love You Baby) 	3:56 	
Oh Baby 	2:25 	
There She Goes Again 	5:01 	
What The Heck, Let's Discothèque 	4:52 	
Spend It On Love 	3:37 	
Checkin' It Out 	3:37 	
I Love You So Much 	4:30 	
Dancin' Shoes  4:00
Tree Of Love 	3:14

References

External links
 Side Effect-Side Effect at Discogs

1975 albums
Fantasy Records albums
Side Effect albums
Albums produced by Wayne Henderson (musician)